Nicolas Seguin (born 6 March 1990) is a French professional footballer who plays as a centre-back for Championnat National 3 club Bourgoin-Jallieu.

Club career
Prior to the start of the 2010–11 season, Seguin signed his first professional contract after agreeing to a three-year deal with Lyon. He joined Dijon on loan for the season on 30 September 2010.  He made his professional debut with Dijon on 15 October 2010 in a Ligue 2 match against Metz. Seguin played the entire match in a 3–1 defeat. 

In 2012 Seguin left Lyon and joined Tours with team-mates Thomas Fontaine and Xavier Chavalerin.

Seguin signed for Lyon-Duchère in the summer of 2015.

International career
Seguin has represented France internationally, having earned caps at under-17, under-18, and under-19 level.

Notes

References

External links
 
 
 

Living people
1990 births
Footballers from Lyon
Association football central defenders
French footballers
Dijon FCO players
Olympique Lyonnais players
Tours FC players
Lyon La Duchère players
FC Bourgoin-Jallieu players
Championnat National 2 players
Ligue 2 players
Championnat National 3 players
Championnat National players
France youth international footballers